USS LST-999 was an LST-542-class tank landing ship in the United States Navy. Like many of her class, she was not named and is properly referred to by her hull designation.

LST-999 was laid down on 8 April 1944 at the Boston Navy Yard; launched on 14 May 1944; and commissioned on 30 May 1944.

During World War II LST-999 was assigned to the Asiatic-Pacific theater and participated in the following operations:

Leyte landings—October 1944
Mindanao Island landings—April 1945
Assault and occupation of Okinawa Gunto — March through June 1945

LST-999 returned to the United States and was decommissioned on 29 July 1946 and struck from the Navy list on 25 September that same year. 3 November 1947, the ship was sold to Dulien Steel Products, Inc., Seattle, Wash., for scrapping.

LST-999 earned three battle stars for World War II service.

References

External links 
 

 

LST-542-class tank landing ships
World War II amphibious warfare vessels of the United States
Ships built in Boston
1944 ships